The Pinzgauer Lokalbahn (formerly Pinzgaubahn or Krimmler Bahn) is a narrow-gauge railway in Salzburg in Austria. The 53 kilometre railway follows the Salzach valley from Zell am See and Krimml through the Pinzgau mountains. The section between Mittersill and Krimml was damaged by flooding in 2005 and reopened in September 2010.

References

External links
 
 

760 mm gauge railways in Austria
Zell am See
Wald im Pinzgau